Macroveliidae is a family of macroveliid shore bugs in the order Hemiptera. There are at least four genera in Macroveliidae.

Genera
These four genera belong to the family Macroveliidae:
 Chepuvelia China, 1963
 Macrovelia Uhler, 1872
 Oravelia Drake & Chapman, 1963
 † Daniavelia Andersen, 1998

References

Further reading

 
 

Hydrometroidea
Heteroptera families
Articles created by Qbugbot